The Sapelo Island Range Front Light (or Sapelo Island Range Beacon) is a lighthouse range light on Sapelo Island, Georgia, U.S.  It is near the Sapelo Island Light and is a contributor to its 1997 National Register of Historic Places nomination.

History
In 1855 a wooden beacon light was built near the main lighthouse.  It was damaged or destroyed during the American Civil War and replaced in 1868.  That structure fell into disrepair and was replaced with the current iron structure in 1877.  It was used until 1899, after which it was dismantled.  It was reassembled and used by the U.S. Coast Guard in World War II to look for submarines. It was restored in 1997 by the Georgia Department of Natural Resources, which manages most of Sapelo Island. It is thought to be the oldest surviving iron structure in Georgia.

References

External links
 

Buildings and structures in McIntosh County, Georgia
Lighthouses completed in 1877
Lighthouses in Georgia (U.S. state)
National Register of Historic Places in McIntosh County, Georgia
Historic district contributing properties in Georgia (U.S. state)
Lighthouses on the National Register of Historic Places in Georgia (U.S. state)
1877 establishments in Georgia (U.S. state)